Pushing On is a dance single from German record producer Oliver $ and Swiss record producer Jimi Jules. It contains a sample of "Pushin' On" by the Quantic Soul Orchestra and originally contained a sample of "Williams' Blood (Greg Wilson Mix)" by Grace Jones, which was subsequently replayed by Mark Summers at Scorccio Sample Replays, recreating all instrumental elements of the sample (piano, bass, etc.). It peaked at number 15 on the UK Singles Chart. The song was credited as the second most Shazamed track in Ibiza for 2014, having been frequently dropped by DJs in festival season.

Track listing

Charts

Weekly charts

References

2014 singles
2014 songs
Ministry of Sound singles